Apatelodidae, the American silkworm moths, is a family of insects in the order Lepidoptera. They are a family within the superfamily Bombycoidea, though they have in the past been considered a subfamily of Bombycidae.

Distribution
Species are exclusively found in the New World, with the highest diversity in the Neotropical realm.

Diversity
Apatelodidae is undergoing taxonomic and phylogenetic revision, as a result of which the exact numbers of genera and species included have been subject to frequent change. "A global checklist of the Bombycoidea" (Kitching et al. 2018) lists twelve genera and 182 species for the family.

Not included in the checklist are taxonomic changes that occurred shortly before, or since, publication. Some examples of such changes are the addition of genera Arotros (transferred from Bombycidae in 2019) and Asocia (newly described in 2021) to Apatelodidae, the synonymization of Apatelodes florisa to Apatelodes schreiteri, or the description of several new species such as Apatelodes navarroi, Pantelodes camacana, and seven new species of Arotros.

Taxonomy
Apatelodidae has historically been placed as subfamily Apatelodinae within the Bombycidae, alongside Phiditiinae and Epiinae. Recent revisions of the taxonomy of Bombycoidea have seen both Apatelodidae and Phiditiidae elevated to separate families within the superfamily, while Epiinae remains a subfamily of Bombycidae. During those taxonomical revisions, several genera formerly placed in Apatelodinae—such as Anticla and Quentalia—were transferred to Epiinae.

Genera
The list below follows the 2018 Global Checklist of Bombycoidea of Kitching et al, with exception of changes since, in which case an additional reference is given.

Apatelodes Packard, 1864
Arotros Schaus, 1892
Asocia Herbin, 2021
Carnotena Walker, 1865
Drepatelodes Draudt, 1929
Ephoria Herring-Schäffer, 1855
Epiopsis Piñas Rubio, 2008
Falcatelodes Draudt, 1929
Olceclostera Butler, 1878
Pantelodes Herbin, 2017
Prothysana Walker, 1855
Thelosia Schaus, 1896
Thyrioclostera Draudt, 1929
Zanola Walker, 1855

References

External links
 ACG  Page of images of Apatelodidae from Area de Conservación Guanacaste, Costa Rica.

 
Moth families